The  was an infantry division in the Imperial Japanese Army. The Tokyo Garrison had responsibility for the eastern region of Honshū (Kantō region), centered on the Tokyo metropolitan area. The six regional commands were transformed into divisions under the army reorganization of 14 May 1888, based on recommendations by the Prussian military advisor Jakob Meckel to the Japanese government.

Action 
As one of the oldest Divisions in the Imperial Japanese Army, the 1st Division saw combat in the First Sino-Japanese War and the Russo-Japanese War.

After the wars, the division returned to Tokyo, with permanent headquarters opened in Minami-Aoyama 15 June 1918. The February 26 Incident was an attempted coup d'état staged by elements of the 1st Division in Tokyo in 1936. Because the situation on the Soviet border was still volatile because of the ongoing Soviet–Japanese border conflicts, the 1st division was soon sent to Manchukuo-Soviet border under the command of the Kwantung Army. The division participated in a Kanchazu Island incident, successfully driving off Soviet invaders by 30 June 1937. 1 September 1937 a 101st division was created to garrison Tokyo instead of 1st Division. Later, the parts of the 1st division have participated in disastrous Nonomhan Incident in 1939.

During the 1944, the division was reassigned to the Philippines to participate in the Pacific War, and initially based in Manila where it formed the core of General Tomoyuki Yamashita's 14th Area Army. Ordered to oppose the re-occupation of Leyte by the American and Filipino forces, the 1st Division landed at Ormoc City on the west coast of Leyte on 1 November 1944. Their orders were to move up Leyte Highway Number 2 to Carigara and to secure the northern half of the island. However, American and Filipino forces had already seized Carigara, and American air strikes had deprived the Japanese 1st Division of its supply chain and reinforcements. Unable to reach Carigara, the Japanese fortified hilltops and ridges along the highway, and defended these areas against the US and Philippine Commonwealth military offensive from 7 November 1944 though 12 December 1944, in fierce combat, including combat in the middle of a typhoon. By the time Battle of Leyte was won by American and Filipino forces, of the 11,000 Japanese soldiers, only 800 were evacuated to Cebu in January 1945. As result, the 1st Division ceased to exist as an operational unit. The remnants of division have participated in the Battle for Cebu City though.

See also
 List of Japanese Infantry Divisions

Reference and further reading

 Madej, W. Victor, Japanese Armed Forces Order of Battle, 1937–1945 [2 vols], Allentown, Pennsylvania: 1981
 Morison, Samuel Eliot. History of United States Naval Operations in World War II. Vol. 13: The Liberation of the Philippines—Luzon, Mindanao, the Visayas, 1944–1945 University of Illinois Press (2002),   
 Vego Milan N. Battle for Leyte, 1944 : Allied And Japanese Plans, Preparations, And Execution. Naval Institute Press, 2006. 
 This article incorporates material from the Japanese Wikipedia page 第1師団 (日本軍), accessed 8 March 2016

Japanese World War II divisions
Infantry divisions of Japan
Military units and formations established in 1871
Military units and formations disestablished in 1945
1871 establishments in Japan
1945 disestablishments in Japan